This is a bibliography of Los Angeles, California. It includes books specifically about the city and county of Los Angeles and more generally the Greater Los Angeles Area. The list includes both non-fiction and notable works of fiction that significantly relate to the region. The list does not include annual travel books, recipe books, and currently does not contain works about sports in the region.

History

California histories containing significant material on Los Angeles
Kevin Starr, former Professor of History and California's State Librarian has written many highly regarded books
on the history of California including the multi-volume Americans & the California Dream Series which contain a significant amount of history about Los Angeles and the surrounding area.  

California: A History. New York: Modern Library. (2007). 416 pp. Single Volume History of California.
Coast of Dreams: California on the Edge, 1990–2003. New York: Knopf. (2004). 784 pp.

Americans & the California Dream Series by Kevin Starr
Americans and the California Dream, 1850–1915. New York: Oxford University Press. (1973). 512 pp.
Inventing the Dream: California through the Progressive Era. New York: Oxford University Press. (1985). 416 pp.
Material Dreams: Southern California through the 1920s. New York: Oxford University Press. (1990). 496 pp.
Endangered Dreams: The Great Depression in California. New York: Oxford University Press. (1996). 432 pp.
The Dream Endures: California Enters the 1940s. New York: Oxford University Press. (1997). 512 pp.
Embattled Dreams: California in War and Peace, 1940–1950. New York: Oxford University Press. (2003). 386 pp.
Golden Dreams: California in an Age of Abundance, 1950–1963. New York: Oxford University Press. (2011). 576 pp.

Los Angeles histories
 Abu-Lughod, Janet L. New York, Chicago, Los Angeles: America's Global Cities (U of Minnesota Press, 1999), Compares the three cities in terms of geography, economics and race from 1800 to 1990
 Bills, Emily, "Connecting Lines: L.A.'s Telephone History and the Binding of the Region", Southern California Quarterly, 91 (Spring 2009), 27–67.
 Bollens, John C. and Geyer, Grant B. Yorty: Politics of a Constant Candidate. (1973). 245 pp. Mayor 1961–73
 Brook, Vincent. Land of Smoke and Mirrors: A Cultural History of Los Angeles (Rutgers University Press; 2013) 301 pages
 Buntin, John. L.A. Noir: The Struggle for the Soul of America's Most Seductive City. (2009). 432 pp.
 Davis, Mike. City of Quartz: Excavating the Future in Los Angeles (Verso Books, 2006).
 Davis, Mike, & Wiener, Jon. Set the Night on Fire: L.A. in the Sixties. (2020). New York: Verso Books. 
 Emerson, Charles. 1913: In Search of the World Before the Great War (2013) compares Los Angeles to 20 major world cities; pp. 194–205.
 Fogelson, Robert M. The Fragmented Metropolis: Los Angeles, 1850–1930 (1967), focus on planning, infrastructure, water, and business
 Friedricks, William. Henry E. Huntington and the Creation of Southern California (1992), on Henry Edwards Huntington (1850–1927), railroad executive and collector, who helped build LA and Southern California through the Southern Pacific railroad and also trolleys.
 Garcia, Matt. A World of Its Own: Race, Labor, and Citrus in  the Making of Greater Los Angeles, 1900–1970. (2001). 330 pp.
 Hart, Jack R. The Information Empire: The Rise of the Los Angeles Times and The Times Mirror Corporation. (1981). 410 pp.
 Jaher, Frederic Cople. The Urban Establishment: Upper Strata in Boston, New York, Charleston, Chicago, and Los Angeles. (1982). 777 pp.
 Klein, Norman M. and Schiesl, Martin J., eds. 20th Century Los Angeles: Power, Promotion, and Social Conflict. (1990). 240 pp.
 Krist, Gary. The Mirage Factory: Illusion, Imagination, and the Invention of Los Angeles. (2018). 404 pp.
 Laslett, John H.M. Sunshine Was Never Enough: Los Angeles Workers, 1880–2010. Berkeley, CA: University of California Press, 2012.
 Lavender, David. Los Angeles, Two Hundred Years. (1980). 240 pp. heavily illustrated popular history
 Leader, Leonard. Los Angeles and the Great Depression. (1991). 344 pp.
 Mullins, William H. The Depression and the Urban West Coast, 1929–1933: Los Angeles, San Francisco, Seattle, and Portland.  (1991). 176 pp.
 Nicolaides, Becky M. My Blue Heaven: Life and Politics in the Working-Class Suburbs of Los Angeles, 1920–1965. (2002). 412 pp.
 O'Flaherty, Joseph S. An End and a Beginning: The South Coast and Los Angeles, 1850–1887. (1972). 222 pp.
 O'Flaherty, Joseph S. Those Powerful Years: The South Coast and Los Angeles, 1887–1917 (1978). 356 pp.
 Payne, J. Gregory and Ratzan, Scott C. Tom Bradley: The Impossible Dream. (1986). 368 pp., mayor 1973 to 1993 and a leading African American
 Raftery, Judith Rosenberg. Land of Fair Promise: Politics and Reform in Los Angeles Schools, 1885–1941. (1992). 284 pp.
 Rolle, Andrew. Los Angeles: From Pueblo to City of the Future. (2d. ed. 1995). 226 pp.; the only historical survey by a scholar
 Sitton, Tom and Deverell, William, eds. Metropolis in the Making: Los Angeles in the 1920s. (2001). 371 pp.
 Standiford, Les. Water to the Angels: William Mulholland, His Monumental Aqueduct, and the Rise of Los Angeles. New York: Ecco. (2015). 314 pp.
 Torres-Rouff, David Samuel. Before L.A.: Race, Space, and Municipal Power in Los Angeles, 1781–1894. New Haven: Yale University press, 2013.
 Verge, Arthur C. Paradise Transformed: Los Angeles during the Second World War. (1993). 177 pp.
 Verge, Arthur C. "The Impact of the Second World War on Los Angeles" Pacific Historical Review 1994 63(3): 289–314. 0030–8684  in JSTOR

Other nonfiction

General

Architecture and urban theory

LGBT

Environment

Art and literature

Guides, architecture, geography
 
  Herman, Robert D. Downtown Los Angeles: A Walking Guide (2004) 270 pp.
  Mahle, Karin, and Martin Nicholas Kunz. Los Angeles: Architecture & Design (2004) 191 pp.
 Nelson, Howard J. The Los Angeles Metropolis. (1983). 344 pp. geography
 Pitt, Leonard and Dale Pitt. Los Angeles A to Z: An Encyclopedia of the City and County. (1997). 605 pp. short articles by experts excerpts and text search

Contemporary issues
 Abu-Lughod, Janet L. New York, Chicago, Los Angeles: America's Global Cities (1999) online edition
 Dear, Michael J., H. Eric Schockman, and Greg Hise, eds. Rethinking Los Angeles (1996) interprets LA in terms of "postmodern urbanism" model. It consists of several fundamental characteristics: a global-local connection; a ubiquitous social polarization; and a reterritorialization of the urban process in which hinterland organizes the center (in direct contradiction to the Chicago School model of cities). The resultant urbanism is distinguished by a centerless urban form termed "keno capitalism."
 Fine, David. Imagining Los Angeles: A City in Fiction. (2000). 293 pp.
 Flanigan, James. Smile Southern California, You're the Center of the Universe: The Economy and People of a Global Region (2009) excerpt and text search
 Fulton, William. The Reluctant Metropolis: The Politics of Urban Growth in Los Angeles. (1997). 395 pp.
  Gottlieb, Robert. Reinventing Los Angeles: Nature and Community in the Global City (2007) excerpt and text search
 Scott, Allen J. and Soja, Edward W., eds. The City: Los Angeles and Urban Theory at the End of the Twentieth Century. (1996). 483 pp.

Planning, environment and autos
 Bottles, Scott L. Los Angeles and the Automobile: The Making of the Modern City. (1987). 302 pp.
 Davis, Margaret Leslie. Rivers in the Desert: William Mulholland and the Inventing of Los Angeles. (1993). 303 pp.
 Davis, Mike. City of Quartz: Excavating the Future in Los Angeles. (1990). 462 pp.
 Desfor, Gene, and Roger Keil. Nature And The City: Making Environmental Policy In Toronto And Los Angeles (2004) 290 pp.
 Deverell, William, and Greg Hise. Land of Sunshine: An Environmental History of Metropolitan Los Angeles (2006) 350 pp. excerpt and text search
 Dewey, Scott Hamilton. Don't Breathe the Air: Air Pollution  and U.S. Environmental Politics, 1945–1970. (2000). 321 pp., focuses on LA smog
 Hise, Greg. Magnetic Los Angeles: Planning the Twentieth-Century Metropolis. (1997). 294 pp.
 Jacobs, Chip, and William Kelly. Smogtown: The Lung-Burning History of Pollution in Los Angeles (2008)
 Keane, James Thomas. Fritz B. Burns and the Development of Los Angeles: The Biography of a Community Developer and Philanthropist. (2001). 287 pp.
 Longstreth, Richard. The Drive-In, the Supermarket, and the Transformation of Commercial Space in Los Angeles, 1914–1941. (1999). 248 pp.
 Longstreth, Richard. City Center to Regional Mall: Architecture, the Automobile, and Retailing in Los Angeles, 1920–1950. (1997). 504 pp.
 Mulholland, Catherine. William Mulholland and the Rise of Los Angeles. (2000). 411 pp.
 Post, Robert C. Street Railways and the Growth of Los Angeles (1989). 170 pp.
 Rajan, Sudhir Chella. The Enigma of Automobility: Democratic Politics and Pollution Control. (1996). 202 pp.

Hollywood
 Balio, Tino. Grand Design: Hollywood as a Modern Business Enterprise, 1930–1939. (1993). 483 pp.
 May, Lary. The Big Tomorrow: Hollywood and the Politics of the American Way (2000)
 Schatz, Thomas. The Genius of the System: Hollywood Filmmaking in the Studio Era. (1988). 492 pp.
 Smith, Catherine Parsons. Making Music in Los Angeles: Transforming the Popular. University of California Press, 2007. (A social history covering c. 1887–1940)
 Stevens, Steve and Lockwood, Craig. King of the Sunset Strip: Hangin' with Mickey Cohen and the Hollywood Mob. (2006). 295 pp.
 Vaughn, Stephen. Ronald Reagan in Hollywood: Movies and Politics. (1994). 359 pp.
 Wells, Walter. Tycoons and Locusts: A Regional Look at Hollywood Fiction of the 1930s (1973)

Religion
 Engh, Michael E. Frontier Faiths: Church, Temple, and Synagogue in Los Angeles, 1846–1888. (1992). 267 pp.
 Engh, Michael E. "'A Multiplicity and Diversity of Faiths': Religion's Impact on Los Angeles and the Urban West, 1890–1940", Western Historical Quarterly 1997 28(4): 462–492. 0043-3810  in JSTOR
 Weber, Francis J. Magnificat: The Life and Times of Timothy Cardinal Manning. (1999). 729 pp. The Catholic archbishop from 1970 to 1985.
 Weber, Francis J. His Eminence of Los Angeles: James Francis Cardinal McIntyre. (1997). 707 pp. Catholic archbishop from 1948 to 1970.
 Weber, Francis J. Century of Fulfillment: The Roman Catholic Church in Southern California, 1840–1947. (1990). 536 pp.

Ethnicity and Race
 Abelmann, Nancy and Lie, John. Blue Dreams: Korean Americans and the Los Angeles Riots. (1995). 272 pp.
 Acuña, Rodolfo F. Anything but Mexican: Chicanos in Contemporary Los Angeles. (1996). 328 pp.
 Allen, James P. and Turner, Eugene. The Ethnic Quilt: Population Diversity in Southern California. (1997). 282 pp.
  Bedolla, Lisa García. Fluid borders: Latino power, identity, and politics in Los Angeles (2005) 278 pp.;  excerpt and text search
 Cannon, Lou. Official Negligence: How Rodney King and the Riots Changed Los Angeles and the LAPD. (1997). 698 pp.
 Degraaf, Lawrence B. "The City of Black Angels: Emergence of the Los Angeles Ghetto, 1890–1930". Pacific Historical Review 1970 39(3): 323–352.  in JSTOR
 Greenwood, Roberta S., ed. Down by the Station: Los Angeles Chinatown, 1880–1933. (1996). 207 pp.
 Griswold del Castillo, Richard. The Los Angeles Barrio, 1850–1890: A Social History. (1979). 217 pp.
 Gutierrez, Ramon A., and Patricia Zavella, eds. Mexicans in California: Transformations and Challenges essays by leading scholars (2009)
 Hamilton, Nora and Chinchilla, Norma Stoltz. Seeking Community in a Global City: Guatemalans and Salvadorans in Los Angeles. (2001). 296 pp.
 Hayashi, Brian Masaru. "For the Sake of Our Japanese Brethren": Assimilation, Nationalism, and Protestantism among the Japanese of Los Angeles, 1895–1942 (1995). 217 pp.
 Horne, Gerald. Fire This Time: The Watts Uprising and the 1960s. (1995). 424 pp.
 Keil, Roger. Los Angeles: Globalization, Urbanization, and Social Struggles. (1998). 295 pp.
  Leclerc, Gustavo; Villa, Raúl; and Dear, Michael,  eds. Urban Latino Cultures: La Vida Latina en L.A. (1999). 214 pp.
 Loza, Steven. Barrio Rhythm: Mexican American Music in Los Angeles. (1993). 320 pp.
 
 Min, Pyong Gap. Caught in the Middle: Korean Communities in New York and Los Angeles. (1996). 260 pp.
 Modell, John. The Economics and Politics of Racial Accommodation: The Japanese of Los Angeles, 1900–1942. (1977). 201 pp.
 Monroy, Douglas. Rebirth: Mexican Los Angeles from the Great Migration to the Great Depression. (1999). 322 pp.
 Moore, Deborah Dash. To the Golden Cities: Pursuing the American Jewish Dream in Miami and L.A. (1994). 358 pp.
 Oberschall, Anthony. "The Los Angeles Riot of August 1965", Social Problems, Vol. 15, No. 3 (Winter, 1968), pp. 322–341 in JSTOR, black riots in Watts
 Ong, Paul, ed. The New Asian Immigration in Los Angeles and Global Restructuring. (1994). 330 pp.
 
 Ríos-Bustamante, Antonio and Castillo, Pedro. An Illustrated History of Mexican Los Angeles, 1781–1985. (1986). 196 pp.
 
 Saito, Leland T. Race and Politics: Asian Americans, Latinos, and Whites in a Los Angeles Suburb. (1998). 250 pp.
 Sánchez, George J. Becoming Mexican American: Ethnicity, Culture, and Identity in Chicano Los Angeles, 1900–1945. (1993). 367 pp.
 Sides, Josh. L. A. City Limits: African American Los Angeles from the Great Depression to the Present (2003)
 
 Valle, Victor M. and Torres, Rodolfo D. Latino Metropolis. (2000). 249 pp.
 Waldinger, Roger and Bozorgmehr, Mehdi, eds. Ethnic Los Angeles. (1996). 497 pp. studies by sociologists

Policing and law enforcement
 Felker-Kantor, Max. Policing Los Angeles: Race, Resistance, and the Rise of the LAPD. (2020).

Collections of primary sources
 Caughey, John and LaRee Caughey, eds. Los Angeles: Biography of a City. (1976). 510 pp. short excerpts from primary and secondary sources
 Diehl, Digby, ed. Front Page: 100 Years of the Los Angeles Times, 1881–1981. (1981). 287 pp.
 Rodríguez, Luis. Always Running:  La Vida Loca: Gang Days in L.A. (1993);  autobiographical novel
 Violence in the CityAn End or a Beginning?, A Report by the Governor's Commission on the Los Angeles Riots, 1965 Official Report online, report on 1965 black riot in Watts; called the "McCone Report" after its chairman

Miscellaneous
 Ethnic Los Angeles
 The Los Angeles Plaza: Sacred and Contested Space
 Race, Place, and Reform in Mexican Los Angeles: A Transnational Perspective, 1890–1940
 Rebirth: Mexican Los Angeles from the Great Migration to the Great Depression
 Irangeles: Iranians in Los Angeles
 The Making of Exile Cultures: Iranian Television in Los Angeles
 From the Shahs to Los Angeles: Three Generations of Iranian Jewish Women between Religion and Culture
 The Shifting Grounds of Race: Black and Japanese Americans in the Making of Multiethnic Los Angeles, Scott Kurashige

Fiction
The Big Sleep, Raymond Chandler (1939)
The Day of the Locust, Nathanael West (1939)
The Arrangement, Elia Kazan (1967)
The Black Dahlia, James Ellroy (1987)
Speed-the-Plow, David Mamet (play, 1988)
The Loved One: An Anglo-American Tragedy, Evelyn Waugh (1948)

See also
History of Los Angeles
List of museums in Los Angeles

References

External links
 The Los Angeles Public Library (City) History & Genealogy Department. The Los Angeles Public Library History & Genealogy Department contains significant collections about Los Angeles area history, an archive of Los Angeles area newspapers and magazines, and a photography archive of Los Angeles dating from the 1880s to the present with over 116,000 photos are available online. 
 Los Angeles City Historical Society

 

Bibliography
Bibliographies of countries or regions
Bibliographies of the United States and territories
Bibliographies of cities